HMS Majestic was a 74-gun third-rate ship of the line launched on 11 December 1785 at Deptford.

Background
She was captained by George Blagdon Westcott, who was killed in the battle.

Captain Cuthbert, of Majestic, transmitted Sanders's letter, adding his own endorsement extolling "the meritorious Conduct of Captain Sanders and his Ship's Company on the Occasion." Espoir and Majestic shared the prize money for the xebec, whose full name was Nostra Senora de Africa.

On 4 April, Majestic and  destroyed a French privateer of unknown name. Head money was paid in 1828, almost 30 years later.

On 4 September 1807, Majestic, flagship of  Admiral Thomas Macnamara Russell anchored off Heligoland, effecting the capitulation of the island to the British.

Majestic was razeed into a 58-gun fourth-rate frigate in 1813.

On 34 February 1814 Majestic encountered the French frigates  and Atalante, in company with the 20 gun American privateer, Swallow, and an apparently unarmed brig. Majestic was able to catch up with and engage the stern-most of the French vessels. After an engagement lasting two and a half hours, the frigate struck. She turned out to be the Terpsichore, of 44 guns and 320 men, under the command of "capitaine de frigate Breton Francois de Sire". In the action, Terpsichore lost three men killed, six wounded, and two drowned as the prisoners were being transported to Majestic; British casualties were nil. Because of the weather and the approach of night, Majestic was unable to pursue the other three French vessels, which therefore escaped. The Royal Navy named Terpsichore HMS Modeste, but never commissioned her.

On 22 May 1814 Majestic recaptured the former British naval schooner , which the American privateer  had captured the year before. At the time of her recapture, Dominica was sailing under a letter of marque, had a crew of 38 men, and was armed with four 6-pounder guns.

Majestic was broken up in 1816 after a stranding.

Notes

Citations

References

 
 
 Lavery, Brian (2003) The Ship of the Line - Volume 1: The development of the battlefleet 1650-1850. Conway Maritime Press. .
 Rüger, Jan (2017) Heligoland: Britain, Germany and the Struggle for the North Sea Oxford University Press. .

External links
 

Ships of the line of the Royal Navy
Canada-class ships of the line
1785 ships
War of 1812 ships of the United Kingdom